The Nuer language (Thok Naath) ("people's language") is a Nilotic language of the Western Nilotic group.  It is spoken by the Nuer people of South Sudan and in western Ethiopia (region of Gambela). The language is very similar to Dinka and Atuot.

The language is written with a Latin-based alphabet. There are several dialects of Nuer, although all share one written standard. For example, final , is pronounced in the Jikany dialect but is dropped in other dialects despite being indicated in the Nuer orthography used by all.

Phonology 
A phonological analysis has yet to be done. The following consonants may therefore not all be distinct.

Voicing is not distinctive at the end of a stem, regardless of whether it's at the end of a word or utterance. Consonant clusters due to suffixes tend to be simplified. 

Dental consonants are written th dh nh in the practical orthography.  is written ɣ.

Vowels may be long or short, modal or breathy voiced. The latter are written with an underscore in the practical orthography, except for u and ä , where there is no modal-voiced vowel to contrast.

 is rare. (Curly brackets indicate the set of æ vowels.) Final  is always breathy voiced. There does not appear to be a distinction between short a and ə.

Faust & Grossman did not find strong evidence for lexical or grammatical tone, with a few exceptions such as the 1sg suffix  and the plural suffix , which have a rising tone.

Dialects
Ethnologue lists the following dialects of Nuer.
Eastern Jikany (Jekaing, Jikain)
Abigar
Western Jikany
Cien
Lou
Nyuong 
Thiang 
Bul Chol  
Gawaar
Laak 
Jagei (geai koay)
Leek
Dok
Haak

Nuer communities

There are different dialects spoken by Nuer groups living in various locations in South Sudan. Some of the Nuer people live in Western Ethiopia. They are called Jikany Nuer. The Nuer of the Upper Nile State are also called Jikany, and those in Jonglei State Lou, Gawaar, Thiang and Laak.

There are also seven counties inhabited by the other groups of Nuer in the western part of the Upper Nile Province currently known as Unity State Bentiu. These counties include:
 Guit County: Inhabited by Jikany kuec cieng community in the eastern Bentiu
 Mayom County: Inhabited by Bul Chol Geah community in the western part of the state
 Rubkona County: Inhabited by Leek community in the northern Bentiu 
 Koch County: Inhabited by Jagei community in the central Bentiu
 Mayiandit County: Inhabited by Haak Bakol-kuoth community in the far south-western part of the state, they are also known as Gatbakol-kuoth. 
 Leer County: Inhabited by Dok community in the southern part of the state.
 Payinjiar county:Inhabited by Nyuong community in the far southern part of the state.

Among the 120,000 people at the United Nations Protection of Civilians Site Bentiu, Nuer is the preferred language for radio and news.

Nuer-speaking Sudanese refugees have formed a significant community in Omaha, Nebraska, United States.

Sample phrases
Nuer:  Naath dial diethɛ kɛ a lɔr kä päärkɛ kɛ ciaŋ malä a mäni cuŋkiɛn. Tekɛ kɛ ca̱r kɛnɛ nhök ti de lät kɛ raan kɛ dämaan a gɔa.

English:  “All human beings are born free and equal in dignity and rights. They are endowed with reason and conscience and should act towards one another in a spirit of brotherhood”.

(Article 1 of the Universal Declaration of Human Rights)

Writing system
The alphabet of Nuer uses 39 distinct letters, shown below in uppercase (majuscule) and lowercase (minuscule) styles.

A line under a vowel, like a̱, means that it is pronounced with breathy voice. The vowels ä, u, and final i are always breathy. A doubled vowel, like in the word raan (person), means that vowel is long. Nuer does have tone, but tone-based contrasts are not common.

History 
The writing system was adopted in 1928 with minor changes being added over the history of the language. Both the Dinka and the Nuer agreed that their languages were so different that they could never share written languages, but they did come up with several common principles.
 final interdental consonants would always be represented as th.
 all voiceless alveolo-palatal consonants would be represented as c.
 the finalized Nuer alphabet consists of the following characters, which are equivalent to the phonemes of the Nuer language:  d, k, l, m, n, p, t, w, g, j, r, y, ŋ, ny, th, dh, nh, ɣ, c, a, e, i, o, u, ö

Language families 
The Nuer language belongs to the following language families, going from smallest to largest.
 Dinka-Nuer languages
 Western Nilotic languages
 Nilotic languages
 Kir–Abbaian languages
 Eastern Sudanic languages
 Nilo-Saharan languages

See also 
 Dinka language
 Nuer people
 Dinka people
 Western Nilotic languages
 Nilotic languages

References

External links

Nuer Project - copious grammatical notes
Nuer Lexicon an interactive online dictionary of Nuer
OpenRoad page on Nuer (Thok Nath)
PanAfrican L10n page on Nuer
Omniglot page on Nuer
World Atlas of Language Structures information on Nuer
 Wright Jay Frank,  Nuer noun morphology, Master of Arts thesis, State University of New York at Buffalo, 1999 (online copy).
Nuer Dictionary

Languages of South Sudan
Languages of Ethiopia
Western Nilotic languages